William Price Sanders (August 12, 1833 – November 19, 1863) was an officer in the Union Army in the American Civil War who died at the Siege of Knoxville.

Birth and early years
William Sanders was born near Frankfort, Kentucky to wealthy attorney Lewis Sanders (Saunders), Jr., and his wife Margaret Hubbel (Price). Through his mother he was a descendent of John Gano, a Revolutionary War patriot. His family moved circa 1839 to Natchez, Mississippi, where he was raised. He was a cousin of Jefferson Davis, and his sister Elizabeth Jane married attorney, mining magnate and thoroughbred horse breeder James Ben Ali Haggin (December 9, 1822 – September 13, 1914), a business partner of George Hearst and the owner of Elmendorf Farm in Lexington, Kentucky. The Haggin family lived next door to the Sanders family in Natchez. William Price Sanders went by the nickname "Doc", but he did not have a medical degree. He was purportedly named in honor of his uncle, a physician. NOTE: Presumably Lewis Bennett P. Sanders, M.D.

Military career
Sanders attended the United States Military Academy at West Point from 1852 to 1856, but was not an outstanding cadet, graduating 41st in his class. West Point Superintendent Robert E. Lee wrote a May 1854 letter announcing Sanders' dismissal, but he managed to avoid dismissal with the help of the U.S. Secretary of War Jefferson Davis. Sanders graduated in 1856, and served in the western territories (including Utah). He was commissioned a brevet second lieutenant in the 1st U.S. Dragoons on July 1, 1856. He became second lieutenant in the 2nd U.S. Dragoons on May 27, 1857.

Despite a pre-war reputation for being sympathetic to the South, Sanders remained loyal to the Union. He was promoted to first lieutenant on May 10, 1861. Four days later he was raised to the rank of captain. On August 2, 1861, the 2nd U.S. Dragoons was renamed the 6th U.S. Cavalry, in which he participated in the Peninsula Campaign and the Battle of Antietam. After Antietam, Ambrose Burnside gave him a command in the Department of the Ohio, resulting in his transfer to Cincinnati, Ohio. On March 4, 1863, Sanders was appointed colonel of the 5th Kentucky Cavalry Regiment.

Sanders was appointed chief of cavalry of the District of Central Kentucky, Department of the Ohio on April 16, 1863. Burnside then decided to have Sanders lead a raid into East Tennessee, where he was to scout out the enemy, as well as disrupt communication and transportation networks.  He also pursued Morgan's Raiders in July 1863.

Sanders was appointed chief of the cavalry corps of the Department of the Ohio in September 1863. Sanders next moved with his forces to Knoxville, where he arrived September 3, 1863. Sanders was appointed brigadier general on October 18, 1863, but this appointment did not become official because he was never confirmed by the United States Senate. Sanders commanded a brigade of the XXIII Corps and then the 1st Division of the cavalry corps of the Army of the Ohio from November 3, 1863, to November 18, 1863, in the Knoxville Campaign.

On November 18, 1863, Sanders was shot in the side and mortally wounded by a sharpshooter of the forces under the command of Confederate Col. Edward Porter Alexander, his old roommate and classmate at West Point. The sharpshooter is believed to have been in the tower of Bleak House. Sanders was taken to the Lamar House. He died the next day in the bridal suite.

Sanders was initially buried in the cemetery of Second Presbyterian Church under cover of darkness, but his remains were later moved to the Chattanooga National Cemetery. He was a bachelor at the time of his death but was dating Sue Boyd, a Knoxville relative of Confederate spy Belle Boyd. Miss Boyd is not believed to have betrayed him and is reported to have mourned his death.

The Battle of Fort Sanders, part of the Knoxville Campaign, occurred approximately ten days after his death.

Namesakes and honors
The Union fortification "Fort Loudon" was renamed "Fort Sanders" in his memory. Knoxville's Fort Sanders neighborhood and Fort Sanders Presbyterian Hospital, both of which are located on the site of the fort, are also named after him.  In addition, the Sons of Union Veterans has a chapter in East Tennessee named in memory of "Colonel William P. Sanders". A historical marker on Kingston Pike denotes the location where he was mortally wounded. Ironically, the marker is on the property of Second Presbyterian Church, which relocated from downtown Knoxville to the place where William Sanders was hit.

See also

List of American Civil War generals (Union)

Notes

References
 Alexander, Edward P. and Gallagher, Gary W. (editor), Fighting for the Confederacy: The Personal Recollections of General Edward Porter Alexander, University of North Carolina Press, 1989, .
 Eicher, John H., and David J. Eicher, Civil War High Commands. Stanford: Stanford University Press, 2001. .
 Heitman, Francis, Historical Register and Dictionary of the United States Army 1789-1903. (US Government Printing Office, Washington, 1903).
 Warner, Ezra J. Generals in Blue: Lives of the Union Commanders. Baton Rouge: Louisiana State University Press, 1964. .
 Law Notice, The Louisianan and Journal of Commerce, New Orleans, Louisiana, February 4, 1839
 Kentucky State Historical Society, Volume 41, Number 134, January 1943, pages 44–62 (Leavy, William A.  Part Four:  A Memoir of Lexington and Its Vicinity)

External links
Sanders Bio

Union General's Stats: Sanders
Antietam on the Web: Sanders
Ohio 45th Battle Account
Loudon Co. Campaign
Bleak House Sharpshooter
2nd Presbyterian Church History
Louisianian Law Notice

Union Army generals
People of Mississippi in the American Civil War
United States Military Academy alumni
1833 births
1863 deaths
People from Frankfort, Kentucky
History of Knoxville, Tennessee
Union military personnel killed in the American Civil War